The Time line of the British Army since 2000,  lists the conflicts and wars the British Army were involved in.
 Sierra Leone Civil War (2000)
 Yugoslav wars (ended 2001)
 Iraq War (2003–2011)
 War in Afghanistan (2001–present)
 War On Terror (2001–present)
 Military intervention against the Islamic State of Iraq and the Levant (2014–present)
 Iraqi Civil War (2014–2017)
 Mosul offensive (2015)
 Mosul offensive (2016)
 Battle of Mosul (2016–2017)

See also
 Timeline of the British Army
 Timeline of the British Army 1700–1799
 Timeline of the British Army 1800–1899
 Timeline of the British Army 1900–1999

21st-century conflicts
Wars involving the United Kingdom
21st-century history of the British Army
British Army 2000